Ischnodemus badius is a species in the suborder Heteroptera ("true bugs"), in the order Hemiptera ("true bugs, cicadas, hoppers, aphids and allies").
Ischnodemus badius is found in North America.

References

Further reading
 
 Catalog of the Heteroptera, True Bugs of Canada and the Continental United States, Thomas J. Henry, Richard C. Froeschner. 1988. Brill Academic Publishers.
 Henry, Thomas J., and Richard C. Froeschner, eds. (1988). Catalog of the Heteroptera, or True Bugs, of Canada and the Continental United States, xix + 958.

Lygaeoidea
Insects described in 1909